Joel Conrad Bakan (born 1959) is an American-Canadian writer, jazz musician, filmmaker, and professor at the Peter A. Allard School of Law at the University of British Columbia.

Born in Lansing, Michigan, and raised for most of his childhood in East Lansing, Michigan, where his parents, Paul and Rita Bakan, were both long-time professors in psychology at Michigan State University.  In 1971, he moved with his parents to Vancouver, British Columbia. He was educated at Simon Fraser University (BA, 1981), University of Oxford (BA in law, 1983), Dalhousie University (LLB, 1984) and Harvard University (LLM, 1986).

He served as a law clerk to Chief Justice Brian Dickson in 1985. During his tenure as clerk, Dickson authored the judgment R v Oakes, among others. Bakan then pursued a master's degree at Harvard Law School. After graduation, he returned to Canada, where he has taught law at Osgoode Hall Law School of York University and the University of British Columbia Faculty of Law. He joined the University of British Columbia Faculty of Law in 1990 as an associate professor. Bakan teaches constitutional Law, contracts, socio-legal courses, and the graduate seminar.  He has won the Faculty of Law's Teaching Excellence Award twice and a UBC Killam Research Prize.

Personal life
Bakan has a son from his first wife, Marlee Gayle Kline, also a scholar and Professor of Law at the University of British Columbia. Kline died of leukemia in 2001. Bakan helped establish the Marlee Kline Memorial Lectures in Social Justice to commemorate her contributions to Canadian law and feminist legal theory. He is now married to Canadian actress and singer Rebecca Jenkins. His brother, Michael Bakan, is an ethnomusicologist.

Works
Bakan authored The Corporation: The Pathological Pursuit of Profit and Power, a book analyzing the evolution and modern-day behavior of corporations from a critical perspective. Published in 2004, it was made into a film The Corporation by directors Mark Achbar and Jennifer Abbott the same year and won 25 international awards. His book Childhood Under Siege was published in August 2011.  Joel Bakan writes in The Corporation:

He is the author of a number of books on Canadian constitutional law, including Just Words: Constitutional Rights and Social Wrongs.

Bakan and his wife Jenkins released a jazz album, Blue Skies in 2008, an album of Jenkins' original songs, Something's Coming, in 2012, and Rebecca Jenkins: Live at the Cellar in 2014.

In 2020, he was codirector with Abbott of The New Corporation: The Unfortunately Necessary Sequel, a sequel to the original film version of The Corporation.

References

External links

"The Beast with No Name: Mark Achbar and Joel Bakan with Williams Cole" The Brooklyn Rail (Summer 2004)
Joel Bakan discusses The Corporation and Childhood Under Siege on The Extraenvironmentalist podcast

1959 births
Living people
Lawyers in British Columbia
Canadian legal scholars
Canadian non-fiction writers
Canadian Rhodes Scholars
Film directors from Michigan
Film directors from Vancouver
Clerks of the Supreme Court of Canada
Schulich School of Law alumni
Harvard Law School alumni
Writers from Lansing, Michigan
People from East Lansing, Michigan
Writers from Vancouver
Simon Fraser University alumni
Academic staff of the Peter A. Allard School of Law
Academic staff of the Osgoode Hall Law School
Canadian documentary film directors